Tupirinna is a genus of corinnid sac spiders first described by A. B. Bonaldo in 2000.

Species 
 it contains the following twenty species:

 Tupirinna albofasciata (Mello-Leitão, 1943) – Brazil
 Tupirinna araguaia Xavier & Bonaldo, 2021 – Brazil
 Tupirinna caraca Xavier & Bonaldo, 2021 – Brazil
 Tupirinna coari Xavier & Bonaldo, 2021 – Brazil
 Tupirinna cruzes Xavier & Bonaldo, 2021 – Brazil
 Tupirinna gigantea Xavier & Bonaldo, 2021 – Colombia, Peru
 Tupirinna goeldi Xavier & Bonaldo, 2021 – Brazil
 Tupirinna ibiapaba Xavier & Bonaldo, 2021 – Brazil
 Tupirinna lata Xavier & Bonaldo, 2021 – Brazil
 Tupirinna luctuosa Xavier & Bonaldo, 2021 – Brazil
 Tupirinna mutum Xavier & Bonaldo, 2021 – Brazil
 Tupirinna oba Xavier & Bonaldo, 2021 – Brazil
 Tupirinna palmares Xavier & Bonaldo, 2021 – Brazil
 Tupirinna platnicki Xavier & Bonaldo, 2021 – Brazil
 Tupirinna regiae Xavier & Bonaldo, 2021 – Brazil
 Tupirinna rosae Bonaldo, 2000 – Venezuela, Brazil
 Tupirinna trilineata (Chickering, 1937) – Panama
 Tupirinna una Xavier & Bonaldo, 2021 – Brazil
 Tupirinna urucu Xavier & Bonaldo, 2021 – Brazil
 Tupirinna zebra Xavier & Bonaldo, 2021 – Brazil

References

Araneomorphae genera
Corinnidae
Spiders of Central America
Spiders of South America